Ustronie Morskie  is a village in Kołobrzeg County, West Pomeranian Voivodeship, Poland. It is the seat of the gmina (administrative district) called Gmina Ustronie Morskie. It is located on the Slovincian Coast, within the historic region of Pomerania.

Ustronie Morskie is a popular summer tourist destination with a beach, guesthouses and restaurants. A Neo-Gothic church of the Exaltation of the Holy Cross is located in Ustronie Morskie.

The village has a population of 1,800.

Gallery

External links

Ustronie Morskie - photo gallery (Polish)

References

Villages in Kołobrzeg County
Populated coastal places in Poland
Seaside resorts in Poland